AM-906 (part of the AM cannabinoid series) is an analgesic drug which is a cannabinoid agonist. It is conformationally restricted by virtue of the double bond on its side chain, leading an increased affinity for and selectivity between CB1 and CB2 receptors. It is a potent and selective agonist for the  CB1 cannabinoid receptor, with a Ki of 0.8 nM at CB1 and 9.5 nM at CB2, a selectivity of almost 12x.

The corresponding E or trans isomer is AM-905.

See also 
 AM-1235
 AM-2389

References 

Benzochromenes
Primary alcohols
Phenols
AM cannabinoids